Poomaram is a 2018 Indian Malayalam-language musical drama film written, co-produced and directed by Abrid Shine. The film stars debutants Kalidas Jayaram as well as Neeta Pillai in lead roles of Malayalam cinema.

Plot
The film is based on the Mahatma Gandhi University Youth Festival which takes place every year, where different colleges under the university participate for winning the champion trophy.

Cast
Kalidas Jayaram as Gauthaman C.A, Chairman of Maharaja's College Union
Neeta Pillai as Irene George, Chairperson of St. Teresa's College Union
 Merin Philip as Friend of Irene
 Architha Anish as Malavika
 Joju George as Police Inspector Daya Swaroop
 Professor Jayaraman Chakiat Siva Rama Menon as Gauthaman's father
 Rohini Nair as Teacher
 Rajesh varma (Script Writer) as Teacher
 Sarvasri as Singer
 Shikha Prabhakar as Singer
 Ismath P.I as Singer
 Ramya Krishnan as Chenda player
 Pooja Suchithran as Harmonium player
 Aparna as Tablist
 Sreeshma as Meenakshi(Meenu)
 Vivek as Vivek C.B(Kili)
 RLV T K Anil Kumar as Dance Master of St.Teresa's College
 Sangeetha S kumar 
 Mintu Maria Vincent
 Noufal PN ( Gauthaman's Friend )
Kunchacko Boban as himself (Cameo appearance)
Renju Renjimar as herself (Make-up artist)
Meera Jasmine as herself (Cameo appearance)
Suresh Thampanoor as Suresh (Cameo Appearance)
Rasnesh Kannadikuzhi as Sunikuttan

Production
Principal photography began on 12 September 2016 in Ernakulam.
Shooting of the movie commenced on 12 September 2016 at Maharaja's College, Ernakulam. St. Kuriakose Senior Secondary School Kaduthuruthy, Mangalam College of Engineering and St. Thomas College, Kozhencherry.

Soundtrack
The first track "Njanum Njanumentallum" was released by Muzik 247 on their YouTube channel in November 2016. The second song "Kadavathoru Thonni" was released in May 2017.

Release
The film was scheduled for release in late-December 2017, but was postponed to March 2018. The film later released on 15 March 2018. The film got mixed reviews.

Accolades

References

External links
 

2018 films
Indian drama films
2010s Malayalam-language films
Films scored by Perumbavoor G. Raveendranath
Films scored by Gopi Sundar
Films directed by Abrid Shine